Norma Claire Thrower (born 5 February 1936) is a retired Australian hurdler. Born as Norma Austin, the South Australian hurdler ran for the Western Districts club in Adelaide.

At the 1956 Summer Olympics in Melbourne, Australia she won the bronze medal over 80 metres hurdles behind countrywoman Shirley Strickland (gold) and German Gisela Köhler (silver).

At the 1958 British Empire and Commonwealth Games in Cardiff she again won the 80m hurdles event, this time ahead of Carole Quinton (silver) and countrywoman Gloria Wigney (bronze).

At the Australian championships she won a silver medal in 1952, a bronze in 1954 and gold medals in 1956, 1958 and 1960.

Thrower set a world record of 10.6 seconds for 80 metres hurdles in 1960, but could not make the final at the 1960 Summer Olympics in Rome.

References 

1936 births
Living people
Australian female hurdlers
Olympic athletes of Australia
Olympic bronze medalists for Australia
Medalists at the 1956 Summer Olympics
Athletes (track and field) at the 1956 Summer Olympics
Athletes (track and field) at the 1960 Summer Olympics
Commonwealth Games gold medallists for Australia
Athletes (track and field) at the 1958 British Empire and Commonwealth Games
Commonwealth Games medallists in athletics
Olympic bronze medalists in athletics (track and field)
21st-century Australian women
20th-century Australian women
Medallists at the 1958 British Empire and Commonwealth Games